Maxwell Griffin (born September 17, 1987 in Riverside, California) is a retired American soccer player.

Career

College and Amateur
Griffin attended Littlerock High School and played college soccer at the UCLA from 2006 to 2009, where he racked up a litany of accolades, receiving a selection to the All-Pac-10 team, and an NSCAA All-Far West selection. He was also nominated for the prestigious Lowe's Senior CLASS Award, and as a senior led the team with four game-winning goals, moving him up to sixth in the all-time UCLA scoring record books . Griffin netted 28 goals overall in his career, increasing his total in each of the four seasons at the school and is one of just 18 players to have scored a hat trick for UCLA in its 43-year history.

During his college years Griffin also played with the San Fernando Valley Quakes and the Los Angeles Legends in the USL Premier Development League.

Professional
Upon graduating from UCLA, Griffin signed a one-year deal with the Austin Aztex FC of the USSF Division 2 on March 23, 2010.

He made his professional debut on April 11, 2010, in Austin's first game of the 2010 season, a 2–0 victory over Montreal Impact, scored his first professional goal on May 29 in a 2–0 win over Crystal Palace Baltimore, and scored a hat trick on June 19, 2010 in a 3–1 win over Miami FC.

Prior to the 2011 season, new owners purchased the club and moved it to Orlando, Florida, renaming it Orlando City. The club will play in the USL Pro league in 2011. At the end of the 2011 USL Pro season, Griffin moved on loan to San Jose Earthquakes.  He last played for Minnesota United FC in the North American Soccer League.

Retirement
Griffin officially retired from professional soccer in April 2014. On his official Facebook page, Griffin stated "After 22 years of playing soccer and these last 4 playing professionally, I've decided to hang up the boots. It's sad to think that I won't be playing as a career anymore, but I am beyond excited to be starting the next chapter of my life at the adidas HQ in Portland. I have met so many amazing people and created lifelong friendships along the way. So thankful and blessed to have had the support of my friends and family throughout my life and career. Also a huge thank you to PROficient Agency for creating so many opportunities for me as a player and making this a very exciting journey."

Personal
Maxwell is the younger brother of fellow professional soccer player Leonard Griffin.

Griffin has also dabbled in acting, and featured in JoJo's music video for her 2006 hit song "Too Little Too Late" alongside several of his UCLA Bruins teammates.

Honors

Club

Orlando City
 USL Pro: 2011

Individual
 USSF D-2 Pro League Rookie of the Year: 2010

References

External links
 
 UCLA bio

1987 births
Living people
American soccer players
Association football defenders
Austin Aztex FC players
LA Laguna FC players
Major League Soccer players
Minnesota United FC (2010–2016) players
Orange County SC players
Orlando City SC (2010–2014) players
People from Palmdale, California
San Fernando Valley Quakes players
San Jose Earthquakes players
Soccer players from California
UCLA Bruins men's soccer players
USL Championship players
USL League Two players
USSF Division 2 Professional League players